Fictibacillus arsenicus, also known as Bacillus arsenicus, is a bacterium. It is Gram-positive, motile, endospore-forming, rod-shaped and arsenic-resistant. Its type strain is Con a/3T (=MTCC 4380T=DSM 15822T=JCM 12167T).

References

Further reading
Staley, James T., et al. "Bergey's manual of systematic bacteriology, vol. 3."Williams and Wilkins, Baltimore, MD (1989): 2250–2251.

Berkeley, Roger, et al., eds. Applications and systematics of bacillus and relatives. Wiley. com, 2008.

External links 

Type strain of Fictibacillus arsenicus at BacDive -  the Bacterial Diversity Metadatabase

Bacillaceae
Bacteria described in 2005